This is a list of villains from the long-running British science fiction television series Doctor Who. For other, related lists, see below.

See also
 List of Doctor Who supporting characters
 List of Doctor Who henchmen
 List of Doctor Who universe creatures and aliens
 List of Doctor Who robots
 List of Torchwood characters
 List of The Sarah Jane Adventures minor characters

External links
 The Bumper Book of Doctor Who Monsters, Villains & Alien Species

Villains
Doctor Who
Doctor Who villains
Villains